Wakefield Street is a main thoroughfare intersecting the centre of the South Australian capital, Adelaide, from east to west at its midpoint. It crosses Victoria Square in the centre of the city, which has a grid street plan. It continues as Wakefield Road on its eastern side, through the eastern Adelaide Park Lands.

History
The street was named after Daniel Bell Wakefield, the solicitor who drafted the Act which proclaimed Adelaide. Like his brother Edward Gibbon Wakefield, he was also involved in the South Australia Association in London, but never visited Adelaide.

In 1911 the Willard Hall and Willard Guest House  were opened by the South Australian branch of the WCTU, named after Frances Willard, United States national president of Woman's Christian Temperance Union (WCTU). In 1928 an old bell was found in the tower, which was probably the first bell cast in Adelaide and made for the church. A 1939 photograph shows the new art deco additions to the building, and the premises of Frank J. Siebert, Funeral Director, on the left.

The Central Picture Theatre, designed by R. R. G. (Rowland) Assheton (who also designed the Grand Picture Theatre in Rundle Street, among others) opened at no. 70 in 1912, featuring silent films until its first talkie screened in 1930. On Saturday 14 May 1938, after a change of ownership and complete refurbishment, the  cinema was opened as the Star, as part of the Clifford Theatres Circuit (and variously referred to as the New Star Theatre, Wakefield Street; Wakefield Street New Star; and the Wakefield Street Star Theatre.). One reviewer described it as "the most modern theatre in S.A.". Architect Chris Smith had designed the new interior, and furnishings were supplied by John Martin & Co. The refit was in Art Deco style. The Star closed around 1959 or 1960 and reopened in 1962/63 as a Greek theatre, the Pantheon. It was demolished (date unknown) and is now the site of a carpark next to an office block tenanted by SAPOL. The building was constructed around 1980, with its address no. 60.

The cinema was situated adjacent to the Wakefield Hotel on its western side. The hotel had existed on this site, on the corner of Divett Place, since 1864, and the stone building stands at no. 76.  In 1927 its licensees were M.G. Henderson and V. Kenny. It is a stone building with cream brick decoration.

The first training hospital for nurses in the colony and then state, Private Hospital, Wakefield Street, occupied various sites between Daly and Hutt Street from 1883–4 until January 2020, when the new Calvary Adelaide Hospital opened on Angas Street.

The Unitarian Christian Church which once stood opposite Francis Xavier's Cathedral was sold to the Public Service Association in 1971. It was replaced with a government building known as the "Wakefield House", a 20-storey building in brutalist style completed in 1980.

Location and description
It runs in from east to west between East Terrace and Victoria Square, and is one of the three streets (along with Grote Street and King William Street) to run through Victoria Square in the middle of the Adelaide city centre. The western end of Wakefield Street is continued across Victoria Square as Grote Street, which extends to West Terrace. The eastern end of Wakefield Street continues as Wakefield Road across the Adelaide Park Lands to Britannia Roundabout on the City Ring Route, Adelaide. Wakefield Road continues on the eastern side of the roundabout as Kensington Road.

Notable buildings
Buildings on Wakefield Street include (more or less west to east):
St Francis Xavier's Cathedral, Adelaide
Adelaide Holocaust Museum and Andrew Steiner Education Centre in the heritage-listed Fennescey House
St Aloysius College, Adelaide
SA Police city branch
 Wakefield Hotel (no. 76) 
The South Australian Metropolitan Fire Service
Our Boys' Institute building, now a boutique hotel
Christian Brothers College, Adelaide
 Former Calvary Wakefield Hospital

Junction list

See also

References

Streets in Adelaide